Messier 72 (also known as M72 or NGC 6981) is a globular cluster in the south west of the very mildly southern constellation of Aquarius.

Observational history and guide
M72 was discovered by astronomer Pierre Méchain in 1780. His countryman Charles Messier looked for it 36 days later, and included it in his catalog. Both opted for the then-dominant of the competing terms for such objects, considering it a faint nebula rather than a cluster. With a larger instrument, astronomer John Herschel called it a bright "cluster of stars of a round figure". Astronomer Harlow Shapley noted a similarity to Messier 4 and 12.

It is visible in a good night sky as a faint nebula in a telescope with a  aperture. The surrounding field stars become visible from a -aperture device. One of  will allow measurement of an angular diameter of 2.5 . At  the core is clear: its 1.25  diameter, meaning a broad spread; and small parts scarcer in stars to the south and east.

Properties
It has an estimated combined mass of 168,000 solar masses and is around 9.5 billion years old. The core region has a density of stars that is radiating 2.26 times solar luminosity per cubic parsec. There are 43 identified variable stars in the cluster.

See also
 List of Messier objects

References and footnotes

External links
 Messier 72, SEDS Messier pages
 Messier 72, Galactic Globular Clusters Database page
 Messier 72, LRGB CCD image based on two hours total exposure
 M-72 Information
 

Messier 072
Messier 072
072
Messier 072
Astronomical objects discovered in 1780